1-2-Switch is a party game developed and published by Nintendo as a launch title for the Nintendo Switch, which was released worldwide on March 3, 2017. The game extensively uses the system's Joy-Con controllers, with players facing each other performing various minigames. By the end of 2021, it sold over 3.63 million copies worldwide, making it one of the best-selling games on the platform.

Gameplay 
1-2-Switch is a party game in which players do not usually rely on what is happening on-screen, but rather make use of audio cues and the functionality of the Switch's Joy-Con controllers to play in several different games. It features 28 different minigames, most of which involve two players, who each use one of the Joy-Con controllers and are often encouraged to look at each other during gameplay. Aside from tutorial videos for each game, players mostly rely solely on audio cues and feedback from the Joy-Con's rumble feature to indicate how well they are performing.

Development 
After Nintendo announced the game at the Nintendo Switch event in January 2017, Nintendo showed off six of the minigames to the public. The game was also unveiled to show off Nintendo's innovative Joy-Con capabilities, through the HD Rumble and IR Motion Camera features.

As a way to promote the milking minigame and the Nintendo Switch, several representatives of Nintendo of America took part in a cow milking competition at a dairy farm in Woodstock, Vermont. Grey DeLisle appears on the cover, albeit with her nose being doctored to look larger.

Reception 

1-2-Switch received "mixed" reviews, according to review aggregator Metacritic.

Upon the release of its initial trailer, several commentators compared the game to the WarioWare series. Ben Skipper of the International Business Times made note of the game's sexual innuendos.

Nintendo's decision to release the game separately from the system was criticized by several commentators, arguing that the game would be better off as a pack-in game, similarly to Wii Sports, although Nintendo stated that they opted to allow consumers to select a game to purchase rather than bundling one and increase the Switch's price so as to not disinterest consumers and compromise the console's sales. Cory Arnold of Destructoid criticized the lack of a true single-player mode, and went as far as to say that the minigames were worse than what was included in Wii Sports, arguing that they lacked any sort of progression.

Sales 
By April 2017, Nintendo reported that 1-2-Switch had shipped nearly a million copies worldwide. By March 2018, that number had risen to over two million. By June 2019, total sales reached 3.01 million. The 2022 CESA Games White Papers revealed that 1-2-Switch had sold 3.63 million units, as of December 31, 2021.

Accolades

References

External links 

2017 video games
Nintendo Entertainment Planning & Development games
Nintendo Switch games
Nintendo Switch-only games
Party video games
Video games developed in Japan
Multiplayer video games
Nintendo games